Salvation Nell is a 1908 Broadway play written by Edward Sheldon. It was adapted to film three times:
 Salvation Nell (1915 film), starring Beatriz Michelena
 Salvation Nell (1921 film), featuring Pauline Starke
 Salvation Nell (1931 film), starring Helen Chandler